Booysens is a western suburb of Pretoria, South Africa.

History
The suburb lies on an old farm called Zandfontein and was developed from 1905, named after the owner C.H.Z. Booysens.

References

Suburbs of Pretoria